The GM New Look bus is a municipal transit bus that was introduced in 1959 by the Truck and Coach Division of General Motors to replace the company's previous coach, retroactively known as the GM "old-look" transit bus.

Also commonly known by the nickname "Fishbowl" (for its original six-piece rounded windshield, later replaced by a two-piece curved pane), it was produced until 1977 in the US, and until 1985 in Canada. More than 44,000 New Look buses were built. Its high production figures and long service career made it an iconic North American transit bus.

Production overview
44,484 New Look buses were built over the production lifespan, of which 33,413 were built in the U.S. and 11,071 were built in Canada (GM Diesel Division).  Separated by general type, the production figures comprised 510  city buses (all U.S.-built);  9,355  city buses (7,804 U.S.-built, 1,551 Canadian);  31,348   city buses (22,034 U.S., 9,314 Canadian) and 3,271 suburban coaches (of which only 206 were built in Canada).  The total production of New Looks was 41,213 transit coaches and 3,271 suburban coaches.

Other than demonstrators, Washington, D.C., was the very first city to take delivery of any GM New Look buses, specifically TDH-5301s built in 1959 for O. Roy Chalk's D.C. Transit System, which operated in Washington, D.C., and the suburbs of Maryland and Virginia.

Several different models were introduced over the following years, and modifications made to the design. See the section below, headed "Description".

Production of the New Look in the U.S. ceased in 1977, when it was replaced by the RTS transit bus. Production continued after this, however, at General Motors Diesel Division in Canada, due to the RTS design being rejected by Canadian transit agencies, with the name plate changing from "GM" to "GMC". Few were produced after 1983 due to the GMDD's introduction of the Classic in that year. The last New Looks to be built were an order for Santa Monica Municipal Bus Lines (now Big Blue Bus) of Santa Monica, California, in 1986. The completion of that order brought a final end to New Look production in April 1986. A few transit systems are still operating them to this day (including Société de transport de l'Outaouais in Gatineau, Quebec), nearly 60 years after introduction and more than 30 years after mass production ended.

The last American-built New Look GM buses were ordered by the city of Wausau, Wisconsin, which placed an order for twelve  transit buses, model T6H-4523N, the last of which was delivered in March 1977.

The GM Buffalo bus, a group of intercity bus models built between 1966 and 1980, shared many mechanical and body parts with the fishbowl models, and were discontinued by the Pontiac, Michigan, plant shortly after the RTS replaced fishbowl model production there.

GM later sold the rights to produce both Classic and RTS models to other manufacturers, and exited the heavy-duty transit and intercity markets for full-sized buses, although production of some medium-duty and light-duty chassis products sold in these markets continued.

Description
Like GM's over-the-road buses, including the Greyhound Scenicruiser, the air-sprung New Look did not have a traditional ladder frame. Instead it used an airplane-like stressed-skin construction in which an aluminum riveted skin supported the weight of the bus. The wooden floor kept the bus's shape. The engine cradle was hung off the back of the roof. As a result, the GM New Look weighed significantly less than competitors' city buses.

Virtually all New Look buses were powered by Detroit Diesel Series 71 two-cycle diesel engines. The original engine was the 6V71 (V6). GM buses used a unique "Angle-drive" configuration with a transverse mounted engine. The transmission angled off at a 45-or-so degree angle to connect to the rear axle. The engines were canted backwards for maintenance access; in fact, the only parts not accessible from outside the bus were the right-hand exhaust manifold and the starter. The entire engine-transmission-radiator assembly was mounted on a cradle that could be quickly removed and replaced, allowing the bus to return to service with minimal delay when the powertrain required major maintenance. Originally, all New Looks were powered by the 6V-71. GM resisted V8 power but eventually gave in to pressure from customers.

(The exception to the above was the  TDH-3301, which was powered by the GMC DH-478 Toroflow four-stroke V6, and had a more conventional T-drive transmission.)

Original transmission choices were a four-speed non-synchronized manual transmission with solenoid reverse and the Allison Automatic VH hydraulic transmission. The latter was essentially a one-speed automatic transmission which drove the wheels through a torque converter. At sufficient speed a clutch bypassed the torque converter and the engine drove the rear wheels directly. A later option was the VS-2, similar to the VH but with a two-speed planetary gearset with three modes: Hydraulic, direct (1:1), and direct-overdrive. The very last batch of American-built New Looks and most Canadian-built New Looks from 1977 through 1987 use the Allison V730 transmission, a traditional three-speed automatic with a lockup torque converter. These four transmissions were the only V-drive transmissions made.

New Looks were available in both Transit and Suburban versions. Transits were traditional city buses with two doors; Suburbans had forward-facing seats (four-abreast), underfloor luggage bays, and had only one door. The floor beneath the seats was higher than the center aisle to accommodate the luggage bays. There were also "Suburban-style" transits which had forward-facing seats on slightly raised platforms that gave the appearance of a dropped center aisle. GM refused to install lavatories on these buses; at least one transit authority (Sacramento Transit Authority in Sacramento, California) added its own.

In the 1970s, AC Transit shortened several 35' New Look buses to 29' by removing a section from the middle for dial-a-ride demand-responsive service, maintaining common parts and drivers with the remainder of its fleet.

In 1967 and 1968, Red Arrow Lines tested a GM New Look bus converted to operate as a railbus on its interurban routes and the Norristown High Speed Line.

Variants based on the New Look
Turbine engines
General Motors had been interested in developing gas turbine engines for highway use and showed the General Motors Firebird series of turbine-powered sports car concepts in the 1950s; to demonstrate the engine's practicality, GM fitted a copy of the same GT-300 "Whirlfire" engine from Firebird I into an "old-look" TDH-4512 transit bus and called it the "Turbo-Cruiser". For the 1964 New York World's Fair, the latest version of the gas turbine engine, designated GT-309, was fitted to a New Look bus (TDH-5303, serial #0001) and named "Turbo-Cruiser II"; the GT-309 was also fitted to the Chevrolet Tilt-Cab truck chassis and called "Turbo Titan III". The GT-309 developed power and torque comparable to the 8V-71 and weighed less, but fuel consumption and emissions proved to be intractable problems. The same TDH-5303 was later equipped with a continuously-variable transmission and rebranded "Turbo-Cruiser III". Production records also indicate a "Turbo-Cruiser V" was built using a T8H-5305A in 1969. The Turbo-Cruiser III drivetrain also was used on the "RTX" (Rapid Transit eXperimental) bus of 1968, prototyping the styling and features of the Rapid Transit Series, which succeeded the New Look buses starting in 1977.

Trolley buses

In 1981–82, Brown Boveri & Company constructed 100 model HR150G trolley buses from  New Look bus shells for the Edmonton Transit System (ETS). Two coaches (No. 192 and 197) were sent to the Toronto Transit Commission (TTC) for evaluation as potential supplements to the aging Flyer E700 trolley bus fleet in 1989 and placed in revenue service in January 1990; pleased with the results, TTC leased 38 more for a three-year term, starting in June 1990. All the leased buses were in the group of ETS fleet numbers between #149 and #199; in TTC service, the leased buses were renumbered with a leading 9 but retained their ETS livery and colors. TTC decided to discontinue trolley bus service in January 1992 to reduce operating costs; as ETS would not allow an early return of the leased buses, TTC continued to run the leased buses on two routes until July 1993.

Back in Edmonton, 19 of the returned trolley buses were retired and used for spare parts, while the rest of the fleet remained in use for 27 years until the Edmonton trolley bus system was shut down in 2009. 28 were sold to Plovdiv, Bulgaria, in an attempt to save the trolleybus system there, but they were abandoned after the Plovdiv trolleybus system shut down as well in 2012. Although they were transferred to Yambol, which had built a trolleybus network but did not have the vehicles to operate it, they were eventually scrapped in 2015 after the city abandoned its plans to open a trolleybus system there as well. A few were preserved after ETS shut down the trolleybus system in 2009: the Illinois Railway Museum received #181 in Fall 2009 and the Seashore Trolley Museum received #125 in 2010.

Articulated buses

A  articulated version was designed and built in 1982 for a Government of Ontario demonstration project. While a New Look body was used, a newer front (to allow a wider entrance), which would eventually be incorporated into the Classic transit bus, was used. For this reason, this model is sometimes not described as being a New Look and is not included in New Look production figures.

Series production took place in 1982–1983, and a total of only 53 were built. With the newer front and older body, these buses, which were model TA60-102N (for Transit Articulated 60 feet long × 102 inches wide No air-conditioning), were a transitional model. Unlike most other articulated buses with an engine in the front section and a powered middle axle, the TA60-102N utilized a "pusher" design that used a conventional New Look drive train and a specially-designed anti-jackknifing articulated joint that limited the angle between the two section to 7° at normal speeds (while traveling straight forward) and to less than 2° at highway speeds. 12 were tested by TTC in 1982, but TTC chose to purchase a fleet of Orion III articulated buses instead.

Model naming
The model naming for the GM New Look bus is shown below. Examples of model names are TDH-5301, T8H-5305N, T6H-5307N, S6H-4504A, and T6H-4521N. (Note that not all possible combinations were constructed.) The front end of the bus remained essentially the same through the production of the New Look.

Manufacturing location was indicated by the serial number. No prefix was used for Pontiac, Michigan, C (Canada) indicated London, Ontario, and M (Montreal) Saint-Eustache, Quebec. All buses with 17-digit VINs were built in Saint-Eustache.

Production figures by model
Production totals are through August 1980, when serial numbers changed to 17-digit vehicle identification numbers.

See also

GM "old-look" transit bus - predecessor model
Flxible New Look bus - its main competitor
Flyer 700/800/900 series - another competitor
Rapid Transit Series - one of two successor models
Classic (transit bus) - the Canadian successor model
List of buses
A bus of this series was prominently featured in the 1994 movie Speed.

References

Bibliography
Burness, Tad (1985).  American Truck & Bus Spotter's Guide, 1920-1985. Osceola, Wisconsin (US): Motorbooks International.  .
Luke, William A. & Metler, Linda L. (2005). City Transit Buses of the 20th Century. Hudson, Wisconsin: Iconografix. .
McKane, John H. & Squier, Gerald L. (2006). Welcome Aboard the GM New Look Bus. Hudson, Wisconsin (US): Iconografix. .
McKane, John H. (1999). The General Motors New Look Bus Photo Archive. Hudson, Wisconsin: Iconografix. .
Stauss, Ed (1988). The Bus World Encyclopedia of Buses. Woodland Hills, California (US): Stauss Publications. .

External links

Yahoo GMC New-Look Bus Group
GM production lists of New Look buses, with serial numbers and original purchasers
DieselBusParts.com a great resource for bus repair, restoration and free manuals.

Buses of Canada
Buses of the United States
New Look
Vehicles introduced in 1959
Full-size buses